Mehmeti (also spelled Mehmedi) is a surname. Notable people with the surname include:

 Admir Mehmedi, Swiss footballer
 Agon Mehmeti, Swedish footballer
 Din Mehmeti, Albanian poet
 Genc Mehmeti, Swiss footballer
 Nazmi Mehmeti, Albanian religious leader
 Ismail Mehmeti, Albanian Programmer(IT) 

Albanian-language surnames
Patronymic surnames
Surnames from given names